Organ transplantation in Japan is regulated by the 1997 Organ Transplant Law which legalized organ procurement from "brain dead" donors. After an early involvement in organ transplantation that was on a par with developments in the rest of the world, attitudes in Japan altered after a transplant by Dr. Wada in 1968 failed, and a subsequent ban on cadaveric organ donation lasted 30 years. The first transplant after the Organ Transplant Law had defined "brain death" took place in February 1999.

Due to cultural reasons and a relative distrust of modern medicine, the rate of organ donation in Japan is significantly lower than in Western countries.

History
The first organ transplant in Japan took place at Niigata University in 1956 when a kidney was temporarily transplanted to a patient with acute renal failure. In 1964 a permanent and full-scale kidney transplant was successfully undertaken at the University of Tokyo, and by 1992 nearly 9,000 kidney transplants had taken place. In the same year, a liver transplant was performed at Chiba University by Professor Komei Nakayama. The first heart transplant in Japan was conducted at Sapporo Medical University in 1968 by Dr Wada. This operation attracted concerns that Dr. Wada's evaluation of brain death was inappropriate, and even though an investigation of possible criminal liability was dismissed, a distrust of organ transplanting developed, particularly of transplants from brain dead donors. This brought subsequent developments in transplanting to a halt.

Cultural attitudes
The Japanese people's views regarding life, death, ethics and religion have influenced their negative attitude toward organ transplanting. The Wada heart transplant in 1968 increased a sense of apprehension, especially regarding the evaluation of brain death. The Shinto religion regards death as impure, and has tainted connotations which have carried through into Japanese culture.

References 

Healthcare in Japan
Japan